The Essential Kris Kristofferson is a 37-track, 2-CD compilation and career retrospective for Kris Kristofferson.

The compilation was released in 2004 and covers the period 1969-1999, although it focuses heavily on the years 1969-1971. Disc 1 covers only this period, spotlighting tracks from his first two albums, while Disc 2 mostly covers the rest of the 1970s, with only four songs from the 1980s (including one by The Highwaymen) and one from the 1990s.

Track listing

Disc 1

Disc 2

References

2004 compilation albums
Kris Kristofferson albums
Monument Records compilation albums
Columbia Records compilation albums